"Love and Anger" is a song written and performed by the British singer Kate Bush. It was the third and final single to be released from her sixth studio album, The Sensual World (1989), on 26 February 1990 and peaked at  38 on the UK Singles Chart. The song also reached No. 1 on the US Billboard Modern Rock Tracks chart in 1989, and was Bush's only chart-topper on any US chart until 2022. The song features Pink Floyd guitarist and vocalist, David Gilmour.

"Love and Anger" was also Bush's debut single on her new US label, Columbia Records. EMI America allegedly "forgot" to renew her contract, so Columbia picked her up.

B-sides
The B-sides on the single were "Ken", "One Last Look Around the House Before We Go" and "The Confrontation", the latter two of which are instrumentals and were only available on the CD release and 12" version of this single. All three songs were written for the episode GLC: The Carnage Continues... of the British TV program The Comic Strip. "Ken" was the theme music for the episode's parody of a Hollywood action movie about British politician Ken Livingstone, whom Bush describes in the song as a "funky sex machine".

Music video

The video for "Love And Anger" was directed by Bush.

Track listings
7-inch and cassette single (UK)

12-inch and CD single (UK and Germany)

Personnel
 Kate Bush – lead and backing vocals, piano
 Paddy Bush – valiha, backing vocals
 Del Palmer – Fairlight CMI percussion programming
 David Gilmour – electric guitar
 John Giblin – bass guitar
 Stuart Elliott – drums

Charts

See also
 List of Billboard number-one alternative singles of the 1980s

References

External links
 

Kate Bush songs
1989 songs
1990 singles
Capitol Records singles
EMI Records singles
Ken Livingstone
Songs written by Kate Bush